Dathopa Tissa I (a.k.a. Hatthadpatha) was King of Anuradhapura in the 7th century, reigning from 640 to 652. He succeeded Aggabodhi III as King of Anuradhapura and was succeeded by Kassapa II.

See also
 List of Sri Lankan monarchs
 History of Sri Lanka

References

External links
 Kings & Rulers of Sri Lanka
 Codrington's Short History of Ceylon

D
D
D
D